Cnemaspis bangara is a species of diurnal, rock-dwelling, insectivorous gecko endemic to  India. It is distributed in Karnataka.

References

 Cnemaspis bangara

bangara
Reptiles of India
Reptiles described in 2020